Our Lady of Peace Shrine, also known as the Immaculate Heart of Mary Shrine, is a Roman Catholic shrine and landmark of the Diocese of San José, located in Santa Clara, California. The most notable feature of the parish is the 32-foot statue of Mary, Mother of Jesus.

History 

Our Lady of Peace church was founded on June 24, 1961. Fr. Joseph G. Sullivan, the founding pastor, oversaw construction of the church, hall, and rectory. In 1969, the Archbishop McGucken of San Francisco asked Fr. Sullivan to transfer to another parish in need of his leadership, and sent Fr. John Joseph Sweeny to serve as pastor at Our Lady of Peace Church. This was the beginning of Fr. Sweeny's 32-year stay as pastor of Our Lady of Peace Church.

In the late 1960s as proposed city planning developed in the city of Santa Clara, Fr. Sweeny recognized the church's strategic location as an opportunity for spiritual outreach to the already-increasing population. He also envisioned a shrine to Mary, the Mother of God, as a “forthright expression of faith” for the times. As he explained, “What child hasn’t responded to the open arms of a mother? Even the adult, if we take time to think back a little bit to our first experiences—experiences of trust, the open arms of a mother—I guess there’s nothing more endearing, and it is next to God.” Drawn to the Shrine by the welcoming statue of Our Lady of the Immaculate Heart, he hoped visitors would then visit the church. In 1976, Fr. Sweeny and a team of supporters established 24-hour Eucharistic adoration. Since then, the church has remained open round-the-clock for prayer.

Establishing the Shrine and creating the statue proved to be more complicated. To support this endeavor, Fr. Sweeny solicited prayers (one million rosaries). Though he never asked for funds, faithful who shared his dream for the shrine began to mail in unsolicited donations. 

After years of prayers and searching for a sculptor, in 1980 Fr. Sweeny contracted Charles Parks to construct the 32-foot steel Madonna. The statue was completed in 1982, on display in multiple cities for several months, and arrived by flatbed truck at Our Lady of Peace in 1983. On October 7, 1983, the Feast of the Holy Rosary, Bishop Pierre DuMaine of the Diocese of San Jose (established in 1981) dedicated the statue and Shrine to the Immaculate Heart of Mary. Fr. Patrick Peyton of the Rosary Crusade was present for the dedication.

In 1996, a Family Learning Center was built to accommodate the increasing attendance and request for faith-based activities, yet space continues to be a constraint to the present day.

In 2002, Pope John Paul II thanked Fr. Sweeny for his leadership and recognized him as a Prelate of Honor, addressing him as Monsignor Sweeny. Later that year, Bishop McGrath asked Monsignor Sweeny to retire (due to health concerns) and invited the priests of the Institute of the Incarnate Word (IVE) to assume pastoral leadership at Our Lady of Peace. They continue to staff a flourishing church and shrine today, supported by the Servants of the Lord and the Virgin of Matara (SSVM or “Servidoras”), the feminine branch of the IVE.

On Divine Mercy Sunday, April 27, 2014, Bishop McGrath dedicated a bronze statue to the canonized John Paul II, directly across from the statue of Mary.

See also
Shrines to the Virgin Mary
Roman Catholic Diocese of San José

External links
Our Lady of Peace Shrine

Shrines to the Virgin Mary
Roman Catholic Diocese of San Jose in California
Roman Catholic churches in California
Culture of Santa Clara, California
Churches in Santa Clara County, California
Buildings and structures in Santa Clara, California
Roman Catholic churches completed in 1983
Tourist attractions in Santa Clara, California
Outdoor sculptures in California
Statues in California
Sculptures of women in California
20th-century Roman Catholic church buildings in the United States